Harry William Meyrick Bentley (born 10 June 1992) is a British jockey. He is a 6 time champion jockey in Qatar. He is Currently racing in the jurisdiction of Hong Kong 

He was educated at Dorset House School and Eastbourne College.

He won two Group 1s on Limato in 2016 - the July Cup and the Prix de la Forêt - but lost the ride to Ryan Moore for Royal Ascot 2017. He was later reunited with the horse, winning a Group 2 race at Newmarket in October 2017. The same day, he won a Listed race on Chain Of Daisies, leaving him on 59 winners for the season, equalling his total for 2016.

Major wins 

 Great Britain
 July Cup – (1) - Limato (2016)

 France
 Prix de la Forêt – (1) - Limato (2016)

References

1992 births
Living people
People educated at Eastbourne College
British jockeys